Gian Marco Berti (born 11 November 1982) is a Sammarinese sports shooter. He competed in the men's trap and the mixed trap team events at the 2020 Summer Olympics. In the mixed trap team event he won a silver medal with Alessandra Perilli which made them San Marino's first Olympic silver medallists.

He won the bronze medal in the men's trap event at the 2022 Mediterranean Games held in Oran, Algeria.

Personal life
Berti studied law at the University of Urbino. His father, Gian Nicola, represented San Marino in sport shooting at the 1988 Summer Olympics.

References

External links
 

1982 births
Living people
Sammarinese male sport shooters
Olympic shooters of San Marino
Place of birth missing (living people)
Shooters at the 2020 Summer Olympics
Medalists at the 2020 Summer Olympics
Olympic medalists in shooting
Olympic silver medalists for San Marino
Competitors at the 2018 Mediterranean Games
Competitors at the 2022 Mediterranean Games
Mediterranean Games bronze medalists for San Marino
Mediterranean Games medalists in shooting
Shooters at the 2019 European Games
European Games competitors for San Marino